This is a list of places in the Australian state of Victoria by population.

Methodology 
The figures below broadly represent the populations of the contiguous built-up area of each city or town as defined by the Australian Bureau of Statistics. The population figures are drawn from the Australian Census Urban Centres and Localities data, where an "urban centre" is defined as a population cluster of 1,000 or more people. Some urban centres include neighbouring towns; for example, the Mildura population in the table below includes Irymple.

The table lists urban centres that have appeared in the top 50 in at least one census since 2001.

Table 

Notes

See also

 Demographics of Australia
 List of cities in Australia
 List of places in New South Wales by population
 List of places in the Northern Territory by population
 List of places in Queensland by population
 List of places in South Australia by population
 List of places in Tasmania by population
 List of places in Western Australia by population

References

Victoria
Victoria by population
Cities by population
Populated places in Victoria (Australia)